Noel Williams is an Alliance Party of Northern Ireland politician, Councillor on Carrickfergus Borough Council and a former Royal Air Force Wing Commander.

He was brought up in Sunnylands, Carrickfergus; attended Sunnylands Primary School and was educated at the old Carrickfergus Technical College before entering the Royal Air Force as a technician.

Williams was later commissioned as a pilot and having gained his Wings flew a variety of aircraft including the Hercules transport aircraft. He traveled all over the world and enjoyed postings throughout the UK as well as tours of duty in the Middle East, Cyprus and Malta, attaining the rank of Wing Commander before leaving the service.

After leaving the Royal Air Force, Williams was appointed as Head of the Energy Saving Trust in Northern Ireland. In this capacity he worked to ensure that householders in Northern Ireland were educated in the benefits of energy efficiency and renewable technology in an effort to reduce their carbon emissions. Williams held a ministerial appointment as the Chair of the Northern Ireland Fuel Poverty Advisory Group, in which capacity he advised the Minister for Social Development on issues relating to Fuel Poverty.

Williams represents the Knockagh District, which stretches from Clipperstown through Woodburn, Sandringham, Trooperslane to Greenisland, on Carrickfergus Borough Council, having taken up his seat in June 2012.

References

External links
Alliance Party website profile 
Official Website

Year of birth missing (living people)
Living people
Alliance Party of Northern Ireland politicians
Royal Air Force officers